Kadirur is a census town and city suburb of Thalassery within the Thalassery Taluk of Kannur District in the State of Kerala, India. Kadirur is located on the Tellicherry-Mysore road.

Demographics
As of 2011 Census, Kadirur had a population of 31,087. Males constitute 44.8% of the population and females 55.2%. Average sex ratio was 1232 higher than state average of 1084. Kadirur had an average literacy rate of 97.7%, higher than the state average of 94%: male literacy stands at 98.5%, and female literacy was 97%. In Kadirur, 9.7% of the population was under 6 years of age.

Schools in Kadirur
   Govt.VHSS Kadirur 

 Tharuvanatheru UP school, Kadirur

 Govt VHSS Chundangapoil

 Mappila Govt. UP school, 5th Mile, Kadirur Kadirur West LP School, Kadirur Kadirur East LP School, Kadirur

Transportation
The National Highway 66 commonly referred to as NH-66 passes through Thalassery town.  Goa and Mumbai can be accessed on the northern side and Cochin and Thiruvananthapuram can be accessed on the southern side.  The road to the east of Iritty connects to Mysore and Bangalore.   The nearest railway station is Thalassery on Mangalore-Palakkad line. 
Trains are available to almost all parts of India subject to advance booking over the internet.  There are airports at Kannur and Calicut. Both of them are international airports but direct flights are available only to Middle Eastern countries. The major road passing through kadirur is the State Highway 30 (SH 30) aka Thalassery - coorg road.

References

Villages near Thalassery
Cities and towns in Kannur district